Tang Sai'er (fl. 1420) was a Chinese White Lotus rebel leader of the Ming dynasty.

She was the daughter of a martial art master in Putai, married Lin San and joined the White Lotus. In 1420, she used the discontent among the peasantry to gather a rebel army against the Imperial government at Xieshipeng. She took the cities Ju and Jimo and defeated several Imperial officials before her army was defeated at Anqiu. After the defeat, she and her rebels mixed with the sympathetic peasantry and disappeared and were therefore never punished. She remained a popular heroine in folk legend and the village Xieshipeng was named after her.

References 
 Lily Xiao Hong Lee, Sue Wiles: Biographical Dictionary of Chinese Women, Volume II: Tang Through Ming 618 - 1644
 Alice Poon: The Heavenly Sword (Sword Maiden from the Moon, Book 1), published by Earnshaw Books on Jan. 10, 2023 (Fiction - Fantasy genre). In the novel, Tang Sai'er is the protagonist who is a Chang'e incarnate.

Ming dynasty people
14th-century births
15th-century deaths
15th-century rebellions
Women in war in China
Women in 15th-century warfare
Ming dynasty rebels
15th-century Chinese women
15th-century Chinese people